Gerhard Königsrainer (also spelled Koenigsrainer, born 16 March 1968 in Merano) is an Italian former alpine skier who competed in the 1994 Winter Olympics.

References

External links
 

1968 births
Living people
Italian male alpine skiers
Olympic alpine skiers of Italy
Alpine skiers at the 1994 Winter Olympics
Sportspeople from Merano
Germanophone Italian people